The Eighth Army Corps was formed on June 21, 1898, shortly after the outbreak of the Spanish–American War, in order to provide a ground contingent to exploit Commodore George Dewey's success in defeating the Spanish fleet in Manila Bay on May 1, 1898. Under the command of Major General Wesley Merritt, Eighth Corps had only one division, curiously numbered as the Second Division. The Second Division was under the command of Brigadier General Thomas M. Anderson.

Eighth Corps defeated the Spanish forces under the command of Governor-General of the Philippines Fermín Jáudenes in the Battle of Manila on August 14, 1898. At the end of March 1900, the complexities involved in dealing with guerrilla warfare and governing the islands led to the transformation of what had been the Department of the Pacific into the Division of the Philippines with four geographical departments, each of which was in turn divided into military districts. This step brought an end to the Eighth Corps. Units of the former Eighth Corps also fought to an eventual victory in the Philippine–American War in July 1902.

Command structure
Following is the Order of battle for the Eighth Army Corps:

Commanding General, Eighth Army Corps: Major General Wesley Merritt
2nd Division - Brigadier General Thomas M. Anderson
1st Brigade - Brigadier General Arthur MacArthur
23rd Infantry Regiment - Lieutenant Colonel John W. French
14th Infantry Regiment -
13th Minnesota Volunteer Infantry Regiment
1st North Dakota Volunteer Infantry Regiment
1st Idaho Volunteer Infantry Regiment
1st Wyoming Volunteer Infantry Regiment
Astor Battery - Captain Peyton C. March
2nd Brigade - Brigadier General Francis Vinton Greene
18th U.S. Infantry Regiment
1st Battalion - Lieutenant Colonel Clarence M. Bailey
2nd Battalion - Major Charles Kellar
3rd U.S. Artillery Regiment
1st Battalion - Captain James O'Hara
2nd Battalion - Captain William E. Birkhimer
U.S. Engineer Battalion, Company A - 2nd Lieutenant William Durward Connor
1st California Infantry Regiment - Colonel James S. Smith
1st Colorado Infantry Regiment - Colonel Irving Hale
1st Nebraska Volunteer Infantry Regiment - Colonel John P. Bratt
2nd Oregon Volunteer Infantry Regiment
10th Pennsylvania Volunteer Infantry Regiment - Colonel Alexander L. Hawkins
Utah Volunteer Artillery Regiment
Light Battery A - Captain Richard Whitehead Young
Light Battery B - Captain Frank A. Grant
California Volunteer Heavy Artillery Detachment

See also
Camp Merritt, California

References

Military units and formations of the United States in the Spanish–American War
Military units and formations of the United States in the Philippine–American War
Military units and formations established in 1898